Garfield Gets Real is an action video game for the Nintendo DS video game console based on the direct-to-DVD CGI movie of the same name starring Garfield the Cat, developed by Gravity-i and published by Zoo Digital in the United Kingdom, and by Destination Software in North America. It was released on Nintendo DS in 2009. A Wii version was planned but never released.

Gameplay
In Garfield Gets Real, players play as Garfield as they play through seven levels of the game that all connect from the cartoon universe to the real world. Each level is a mini-game. In Level 1, 2, 4, and 5 Garfield must collect a certain amount of food (in Level 1 - falling books). In Level 6 Garfield must dance to prove that he is still Garfield. In Level 3 and 7 Garfield must pass through the full-trap areas. In Level 3 he must complete his comic strip way, in Level 7 - rescue Odie.

Reception

On Metacritic this game was given an aggregated score of 39/100, based on 4 critics, indicating generally unfavorable reviews.

References

External links
Zoo Digital Publishing DS's page about Garfield Gets Real

2009 video games
Action video games
Cancelled Wii games
Nintendo DS games
Video games based on Garfield
Video games based on adaptations
Destination Software games
Video games developed in the United Kingdom
Video games with 2.5D graphics